Atar is both a given name and a surname. Notable people with the name include:

Atar Arad (born 1945), Israeli-American violist
Doron Ben-Atar (born 1957), historian and playwright
Eliran Atar (born 1987), Israeli footballer
Reuven Atar (born 1969), Israeli footballer